"Let's Party" is a song by British novelty pop music act Jive Bunny and the Mastermixers, the third single released by the father-and-son DJ team Andy and John Pickles. Released on 4 December 1989, it reached the top of the UK Singles Chart for a single week the same month. They became only the third act to reach  1 with their first three singles, following on from Gerry and the Pacemakers in 1964 and Frankie Goes to Hollywood in 1984, and took the shortest time to achieve the feat.

Production and composition
The record follows on from the formula which took their earlier singles "Swing the Mood" and "That's What I Like" to number one on the charts. Although it did not appear on Jive Bunny: The Album, the track took its melodic hook from Joe Loss's "March of the Mods" - the same as the album's closing track "Hopping Mad".
Unlike Jive Bunny's previous two hits, it was not a major international hit, although it reached No. 2 in Ireland, and charted in several other European nations.

The difference was it sampled classic Christmas songs instead.  These included the 1973 Christmas No. 1 Slade's "Merry Xmas Everybody" and Gary Glitter's "Another Rock and Roll Christmas".  It also included Wizzard's "I Wish It Could Be Christmas Everyday" but, as they did not have permission to use the song, they got the group's lead singer Roy Wood to re-record the song.

Following Gary Glitter's convictions, later editions on download and streaming sites replaced his track with Mariah Carey's "All I Want For Christmas Is You".

Charts

Weekly charts

Year-end charts

Certifications and sales

References

1989 songs
1989 singles
Jive Bunny and the Mastermixers songs
British Christmas songs
UK Singles Chart number-one singles
Telstar Records singles
Songs about parties